The Château de Busset is a castle which has been developed into a château in the commune of Busset in the Allier department of France. It is the ancestral home of the Bourbon-Busset family. It is currently owned by a Swiss family.

The castle is not open to the public. It has been listed since 1981 as a monument historique by the French Ministry of Culture.

See also
List of castles in France

References

External links

 

Castles in Auvergne-Rhône-Alpes
Châteaux in Allier
Monuments historiques of Allier
House of Bourbon-Busset